The second Weil cabinet was the state government of Lower Saxony between 2017 and 2022, sworn in on 22 November 2017 after Stephan Weil was elected as Minister-President of Lower Saxony by the members of the Landtag of Lower Saxony. It was the 29th Cabinet of Lower Saxony.

It was formed after the 2017 Lower Saxony state election by the Social Democratic Party (SPD) and Christian Democratic Union (CDU). Excluding the Minister-President, the cabinet comprised ten ministers. Five were members of the SPD and five were members of the CDU.

The second Weil cabinet was succeeded by the third Weil cabinet on 8 November 2022.

Formation 

The previous cabinet was a coalition government of the SPD and The Greens led by Minister-President Stephan Weil of the SPD.

The election took place on 15 October 2017, and resulted in a modest improvement for the SPD and losses for the Greens. The opposition CDU fell to second place behind the SPD. The FDP also took small losses, while the AfD debuted at 6%.

Overall, the incumbent coalition lost its majority as the decline in Greens support outweighed SPD gains. The FDP ruled out a coalition with the SPD and Greens while the Greens ruled out a coalition with the CDU and FDP, leaving a grand coalition of the SPD and CDU as the only practical option. The two parties agreed to begin discussions on 26 October. On 16 November, they announced that they had come to an agreement, which was approved by the SPD party congress two days later and the CDU congress on the 20th. It was formally signed the next day.

Weil was elected as Minister-President by the Landtag on 22 November 2017, winning 104 votes out of 137 cast.

Composition

External links

References 

Cabinets of Lower Saxony
State governments of Germany
Cabinets established in 2017
Cabinets disestablished in 2022
2017 establishments in Germany
2022 disestablishments in Germany